Encina was a DCE-based transaction processing system developed by Transarc, who were later acquired by IBM.

It was used as the basis of IBM TXSeries, which is a variant of CICS for non-mainframe platforms (however, in newer versions of TXSeries, the Encina component has been removed.)

References 

Transaction processing
IBM software